Herklotz is a surname. Notable people with the surname include:

Silvio Herklotz (born 1994), German cyclist
Maju Herklotz (born 1975), Brazilian fencer

See also
 Herklots